William Allan (1904 – 23 November 1969) was a Scottish footballer who played as a right back for Burnbank Athletic, Hamilton Academical, Motherwell, Dalbeattie Star, Partick Thistle, Bo'ness and Albion Rovers.

Known as 'Puggy', he made his debut for Hamilton Academical on 11 August 1928 at home to Third Lanark. Overall, he made 211 appearances for the Accies, featuring on the losing side in the semi-final of the 1931–32 Scottish Cup.

In December 1933 he moved to local rivals Motherwell, one of Scotland's leading teams in the period. Over the course of his time at Fir Park he made 30 appearances in the league without scoring.

While at Burnbank Athletic, he played four games at junior international level as well as playing for Lanarkshire. The closest he came for a senior Scotland cap was when he was selected as a reserve against France in May 1932.

References 

1904 births
Date of birth missing
1969 deaths
Scottish footballers
Association football defenders
Burnbank Athletic F.C. players
Hamilton Academical F.C. players
Dalbeattie Star F.C. players
Partick Thistle F.C. players
Bo'ness F.C. players
Albion Rovers F.C. players
Scottish Junior Football Association players
Scottish Football League players
Scotland junior international footballers
People from Strathaven
Footballers from South Lanarkshire